The Yale School of Art is the art school of Yale University. Founded in 1869 as the first professional fine arts school in the United States, it grants Masters of Fine Arts degrees to students completing a two-year course in graphic design, painting/printmaking, photography, or sculpture.

U.S. News & World Report's 2012 and 2013 rankings rated Yale first in the United States for its Masters of Fine Arts programs. The Yale Daily News reported in February 2007 that 1,215 applicants for its class of 2009 sought admission to 55 places. The Yale Alumni Magazine reported in November 2008 that the School admitted sixty-five applicants from among 1,142 for its class of 2010, and that fifty-six enrolled.

Any student applying to the school must have an exceptional undergraduate record as well as a complete body of work for presentation. This is further followed by an essay and recommendations. The complete process for an applicant requires great preparation and the process must be completed in accordance with strict guidelines established by the school.

History

The Trumbull Gallery (1832–1864) 
The study of the visual arts at Yale began with the opening of the Trumbull Gallery in 1832. The Gallery was founded by portrait artist Colonel John Trumbull with the help of Professor Benjamin Silliman, a prominent chemist.

School of Fine Arts (1864–1950) 

In 1864, Augustus Russell Street donated funds for the establishment of a School of Fine Arts at Yale. In his bequest, Street stipulated that it be “a school for practical instruction, open to both sexes, for such as propose to follow art as a profession.” The program was placed under an art council, one of whose members was the painter-inventor Samuel F. B. Morse, a graduate of Yale College. Yale alumnus Andrew Dickson White was petitioned by the school's faculty to become the first dean, but instead opted to be the first president of Cornell University. A new building for the school, Street Hall, was completed in 1866.

John Ferguson Weir, an artist, was the first director, and later a dean, of the Yale School of Fine Arts. He played a leading role in determining the initial curriculum at the school. While he did not attend a college or university, he studied under his father, Robert W. Weir, professor of art at the US Military Academy in West Point. As Weir began work on curriculum development at Yale he sought some guidance from his younger brother, Julian Alden Weir, who was studying art in Paris. This additional information is taken from John Ferguson Weir's Wikipedia Biography Entry. Please refer to it for more detail.

When the School of Fine Arts opened to students in 1869, it was the first of its kind affiliated with a tertiary institution in America. A three-year course in drawing, painting, sculpture, and art history was inaugurated. Two women—Alice and Susan Silliman, daughters of Benjamin Silliman Jr.—enrolled in the first cohort of three students, and the School of Fine Arts became the first of Yale's schools to allow co-educational instruction. For the next four decades, more than three-quarters of its students were women. 
Early on, the three-year program yielded a certificate of completion. A degree program was created in 1891 with the authorization of a Bachelor of Fine Arts degree by the university's governing body.

Several other arts disciplines were added to the School of Fine Arts and later became independent schools. Architectural instruction was begun in 1908 and was established as a department in 1916 with Everett Victor Meeks at its head. The architecture program quickly became dominant, especially under painter Eugene Savage's efforts to reframe painting and sculpture as "architectural arts" in the 1920s. Drama, under the direction of George Pierce Baker and with its own separate building, was added in 1925 and continued to function as a department of the School until it became an independent school in 1955.

Department of Design (1950–1958) 
Josef Albers came to the Yale in 1950. As department chair, "he reimagined the [Yale] curriculum by integrating painting, sculpture, graphic arts, and architecture under the common purpose of design."

Albers taught that the "unique qualities of perceptual understanding in visual education are that they are applicable to all areas of art--architecture, fine arts, design, photography, and all of the crafts. Perceptual understanding always is relevant, since it transcends all styles and time frames--it is never in or out of date." Blurring the distinction between the fine arts and applied arts, Albers "transformed the teaching of art and design in the 20th century by asserting that the point of making of art is not the finished product, but the process — that art is not an object, art is an experience."

The department of graphic design (initially called graphic arts) was begun in 1951 under the direction of Alvin Eisenman. It was the first graduate program in graphic design in the United States.

School of Art and Architecture (1959–1972) 
In 1959 the School of Art and Architecture was made a fully graduate professional school. Four years later the Art and Architecture Building was opened to much controversy. Designed by Paul Rudolph, its brutalist style was poorly received at the time of completion.

School of Art (1972–present) 
In 1972, the School of Art and the School of Architecture, were split. They continued to share the Art and Architecture building until 2000. In 2000, the art school moved into a newly renovated building around the corner from Rudolph Building called Holcombe T. Green Jr., Hall. Designed partially by Louis Kahn, the building had been built as the New Haven Jewish Community Center; its renovations were designed by architect Deborah Berke. Green Hall houses BFA and MFA students in photography and graphic design. The painting MFAs have their own building behind Green Hall; sculpture MFAs, who used to be in Hammond Hall across campus (since demolished), are now in a new sculpture building at 36 Edgewood, designed by Kiernan Timberlake and Associates.

In 2021, the School of Art announced that they would be hiring the first woman of color (and only second woman) to hold the position of Dean. Dr. Kymberly Pinder comes to the School of Art after serving as acting president of MassArt in Boston.

Study
The degree of Master of Fine Arts is the only degree offered by the School of Art. It is conferred upon recommendation of the faculty after successful completion of all course work in residence and after a faculty-approved thesis presentation. The minimum residence requirement is two years. All candidates’ work is reviewed by faculty at the end of each term. Yale College, the undergraduate division of Yale University, offers a Bachelor of Arts degree program with a major in art. Undergraduate applicants wishing to major in art at Yale must apply to Yale College directly.

The program in art offers courses that, through work in a variety of media, provide an experience in the visual arts as part of a liberal education as well as preparation for graduate study and professional work. Courses at the 100 level stress the fundamental aspects of visual formulation and articulation. Courses numbered 200 through 499 offer increasingly intensive study leading to greater specialization in one or more of the visual disciplines such as graphic design, painting/printmaking, photography, and sculpture.

The prerequisites for acceptance into the major are a sophomore Review, which is an evaluation of work from studio courses taken at Yale School of Art, and five terms of introductory (100-level) courses. Four must be completed at the time of the Sophomore Review. Visual Thinking (Art 111a or b) and Basic Drawing (Art 114a or b) are mandatory. In exceptional cases, arrangements for a special review during the junior year may be made with the director of undergraduate studies in art.

For graduation as an art major, a total of fourteen 14 course credits in the major field is required. These fourteen course credits must include the following: (1) five prerequisite courses at the 100 level (including Visual Thinking and Basic Drawing); (2) five 200-level and above courses; (3) the Junior Major Seminar (Art 395a) or Critical Theory in the Studio (Art 201b); (4) the Senior Project (Art 495b); and (5) two courses in the History of Art. Suggested program guidelines and specific requirements for the various areas of concentration are available from the director of undergraduate studies. A suggested program guideline is as follows:

Freshman year studio courses, two terms sophomore year studio courses, three terms art history, one term junior year studio courses, three terms including the junior major seminar art history, one term senior year studio courses, four terms including the senior project.

The School of Art offers professional instruction in four interrelated areas of study: graphic design, painting/printmaking, photography, and sculpture.

The graduate student's primary educational experience is centered on studio activity. Supporting this are structured courses such as drawing, filmmaking, and the relativity of color.

Rankings 
, U.S. News & World Report ranks Yale School of Art as second equal in fine arts. By specialty, the school is ranked first in painting/drawing and photography, and second for sculpture and design. In 2017 art website Artsy also ranked the school first, stating that it's "topped nearly every annual survey of the best MFA programs in the nation."

Notable alumni 
Among the list of notable artists who have graduated from Yale are graphic designers Ivan Chermayeff, Alan Fletcher, Tom Geismar, and Norman Ives; painters William Bailey, Jennifer Bartlett, Chuck Close, Joan Wadleigh Curran, John Currin, Lisa Yuskavage, Isabella Doerfler, Rackstraw Downes, Janet Fish, Audrey Flack, Gary Lang, Robert Mangold, Brice Marden, Sean Landers, Tameka Norris, Mickalene Thomas, Robert Vickrey, Kehinde Wiley, and Lewis Edwin York; photographers David Levinthal, Gail Albert Halaban, Dawoud Bey, Gregory Crewdson, Philip-Lorca diCorcia, Pao Houa Her, and Constance Thalken; the printmaker Imna Arroyo, sculptors Eva Hesse, Nancy Graves, Wangechi Mutu, Charlotte Park Martin Puryear, Frederic Remington, Priscilla Roberts, Fred Sandback, and Richard Serra; cartoonist Garry Trudeau; and multimedia artists Matthew Barney and Alex Da Corte.

References

Works cited
 
 
Boyle, Richard, Hilton Brown, Richard Newman (2002). MILK AND EGGS: The American Revival of Tempera Painting, 1930-1950.

Further reading

External links

Yale Graphic Design Board

 
Art
Graphic design schools in the United States
Educational institutions established in 1869
1869 establishments in Connecticut
Arts organizations established in the 1860s
Art schools in Connecticut